Kanzaki is a Japanese surname. Notable people with the surname include:

, Japanese footballer
, Japanese shogi player
, Japanese manga artist
, Japanese figure skater
, Japanese footballer
, Japanese actress
, Japanese politician

Fictional characters
, a character in the manga series Demon Slayer: Kimetsu no Yaiba
, a character in the light novel series Aria the Scarlet Ammo
, a character in the light novel series Sword Art Online Alternative Gun Gale Online
Hayato Kanzaki, a character in the video game Star Gladiator
, a character in the manga series Blend S
, a character in the anime series The Vision of Escaflowne
, a character in the light novel series A Certain Magical Index
, a character in the media franchise Aikatsu!
, a character in the video game The Idolmaster Cinderella Girls
Satoru Kanzaki, a character in the manga series Area 88
, a character in the media franchise Sakura Wars
, a character and the main antagonist in the Tokusatsu TV series Kamen Rider Ryuki.
, a character from the manga and anime series Great Teacher Onizuka

Japanese-language surnames